Warm is a 1967 album by The Lettermen.

Track list
"Our Winter Love", Johnny Cowell / Robert Tubert
"Symphony for Susan", Bill Stegmeyer
"Don't Blame It on Me", Dick Addrisi / Don Addrisi
"Warm",  written by Sid Jacobson, Jimmy Krondes (also David Buskin)
"Sleep Walk", vocal version
"She Don't Want Me Now"
"For No One", John Lennon / Paul McCartney
"Smoke Gets in Your Eyes", Otto Harbach / Jerome Kern
"Here, There and Everywhere", John Lennon / Paul McCartney
"A Place for the Winter"
"Chanson d'Amour", Wayne Shanklin

References

1967 albums
The Lettermen albums
Capitol Records albums